Helen Glass,  (née Preston; October 24, 1917 - February 14, 2015) was a Canadian nurse, educator, administrator, and researcher.

Born in Regina, Saskatchewan, she received a Diploma in Nursing from the Royal Victoria Hospital School of Nursing in Montreal, in 1939. She then worked in different hospitals as a nurse. She began her career in teaching nursing in 1953 at the Holy Family School of Nursing, in Prince Albert, Saskatchewan. After moving to Winnipeg in 1955, she earned a certificate in teaching and supervision from the University of Manitoba in 1958.

In 1960, she received a Bachelor of Science in Nursing from Columbia University and a Master of Arts in 1961. She earned a Master of Education (1970) and a Doctor of Education (Nursing) (1971) also from Columbia. In 1962, she started teaching at the University of Manitoba's School of Nursing and became the Director in 1972. She played an important role in establishing a graduate program in nursing and in creating the Manitoba Nursing Research Institute. She was President of the Canadian Nurses Association. She also contributed to the wording and scope of the Canada Health Act in 1984.

Honours
In 1988, she was made an Officer of the Order of Canada and was made a Member of the Order of Manitoba in 2008. She was inducted into the Teacher's College Nursing Hall of Fame at Columbia University. She received honorary degrees from Memorial University (1983), the University of Western Ontario (1986), St. Francis Xavier University (1991), the Université de Montréal (1993), and McGill University (1995).

References

Sources
 

1917 births
2015 deaths
Canadian nurses
Canadian women nurses
Columbia University School of Nursing alumni
Members of the Order of Manitoba
Officers of the Order of Canada
People from Regina, Saskatchewan
University of Manitoba alumni
Nursing educators